"Body" is a 2007 single by American rapper Ja Rule. It features Ashley Joi and was produced by 7 Aurelius. The music video for the song was directed by Hype Williams and it premiered on BET's Access Granted on September 20, 2007.

"Body" is a track on the Ja Rule album The Mirror, which was intended for release in 2007 but was shelved, then eventually released online for free in 2009.

Conception
Ja Rule initially wrote the song in a club, as he saw some women dance. In an interview with BET, Ja Rule said that it was too explicit to describe the process of writing the lyrics of the song. According to Ja Rule, he was having sex with a groupie when he thought of the chorus.

Charts

References

2007 singles
Ja Rule songs
Songs written by Ja Rule
Songs written by Irv Gotti
Music videos directed by Hype Williams
2007 songs
Songs written by Channel 7 (musician)
Universal Records singles